The Russian Greek Catholic Church (Rossiyskaya greko-katolicheskaya tserkov), Russian Byzantine Catholic Church or simply Russian Catholic Church, is a sui iuris Byzantine Rite Eastern Catholic jurisdiction of the worldwide Catholic Church. Historically, it represents the first reunion of members of the Russian Orthodox Church with the Catholic Church. It is in full communion with and subject to the authority of the Pope of Rome as defined by Code of Canons of the Eastern Churches.

Russian Catholics historically had their own episcopal hierarchy in the Russian Catholic Apostolic Exarchate of Russia and the Russian Catholic Apostolic Exarchate of Harbin, China. However, these offices are currently vacant. Their few parishes are served by priests ordained in other Eastern Catholic churches, former Eastern Orthodox priests, and Latin Church Catholic priests with bi-ritual faculties. The Russian Greek Catholic Church is currently led by Bishop Joseph Werth as its ordinary.

Background 
According to Fr. Christopher Lawrence Zugger, the conversion of Kievan Rus in 988 at the orders of St. Vladimir the Great was an entry into a still unified Christendom. It was only over the centuries following the Great Schism in 1054 that anti-Papal and anti-Catholic beliefs grew as a result of the Church in Rus strengthening its alliance with the Ecumenical Patriarchate of Constantinople. In 1441, however, Grand Prince Vasily II of Moscow embraced Caesaropapism by ordering the imprisonment of Isidore of Kiev, the Metropolitan of Kiev and all Rus', for attempting to implement the reunion decrees of the Council of Florence, and his replacement by Metropolitan Jonah. It was only then that the Church in Rus' became definitively schismatic and non-Catholic. The schism was further cemented in 1588, when the Metropolitan See of Moscow was raised to a patriarchate by the Ecumenical Patriarch. By this time, the separation had become so complete that both churches accused each other of being heretics.

As growing numbers of members of the Eastern Catholic Churches fell under the rule of the House of Romanov as a result of the Khmelnytsky Uprising, the Great Northern War, and the Partitions of Poland, they experienced escalating persecution. 

For example, on 11 July 1705, Tsar Peter I of Russia was so enraged to see icons of Greek Catholic martyr Josaphat Kuntsevych inside the Basilian monastery church in Polotsk, that the Tsar immediately desecrated the Eucharist and then personally murdered several priests who attempted to retrieve it.

in 1721, the same Tsar and Theophan Prokopovich, as part of their Church reforms, replaced the Patriarch of Moscow with a department of the civil service headed by an Ober-Procurator and called the Most Holy Synod, which oversaw the running of the church as an extension of the Tsar's government.

Meanwhile, with the grudging exception of the Armenian Catholic Church, the Eastern Catholic Churches were increasingly treated as illegal in the Russian Empire beginning with the forced conversion of the Archeparchy of Polotsk-Vitebsk by Bishop Yosyf Semashko in 1839 and continuing with the 1874-1875 Conversion of Chelm Eparchy and the martyrdom of 13 unarmed men and boys by the Imperial Russian Army in the village of Pratulin, near Biała Podlaska on January 24, 1874.

Intellectual precursors
The modern Russian Catholic Church owes much to the inspiration of poet and philosopher Vladimir Sergeyevich Solovyov (1853–1900), who urged, following Dante, that, just as the world needed the Tsar as a universal monarch, the Church needed the Pope of Rome as a universal ecclesiastical hierarch. Solovyov further argued, however, that the Russian Orthodox Church, "is only separated from Rome de facto, so that one can profess the totality of Catholic doctrine while continuing to belong to the Russian Orthodox Church."

On August 9, 1894, a Russian Orthodox priest and protegé of Solovyov, Fr. Nicholas Tolstoy, entered into full communion with the Holy See by making profession of faith before Bishop Félix Julien Xavier Jourdain de la Passardière at the Church of St. Louis des Français in Moscow. Under oath, Fr. Nicholas renounced all contrary to Catholic doctrine and accepted both the Council of Florence and the First Vatican Council. At Fr. Nicholas's request, all documents relating to his conversion were conveyed to Pope Leo XIII, who kept them along with a personal archive of papers having, "to do with matters in which the Pope was particularly interested."

The person most responsible for the creation of the Russian Greek Catholic Church, however, was Metropolitan bishop Andrey Sheptytsky of the Ukrainian Greek Catholic Church. According to his biographer Fr. Cyril Korolevsky, Sheptytsky's lifelong obsession with reuniting the Russian people with the Holy See goes back at least to his first trip there in 1887. Afterwards, Sheptytsky "wrote some reflections" between October and November of 1887, and expressed his belief, "that the Great Schism, which became definitive in Russia in the fifteenth century, was a bad tree, and it was useless to keep cutting the branches without uprooting the trunk itself, because the branches would always grow back."

History
Tsarist policy of persecuting Eastern Catholics continued unchecked until the Russian Revolution of 1905, when Tsar Nicholas II  grudgingly granted religious tolerance. Thereafter, communities of Russian Greek Catholics emerged and became organized. Old Believers were prominent in the early years of the movement. After the Russian Revolution of 1905, the semi-underground parish of the Russian Greek Catholic Church in St. Petersburg split between the followers of Pro-Latinisation priest Fr. Aleksei Zerchaninov and those of Pro-Orientalist priest Fr. Ivan Deubner. When asked by Metropolitan Andrey Sheptytsky to make a decision on the dispute, Pope Pius X decreed that Russian Greek Catholic priests should offer the Divine Liturgy Nec Plus, Nec Minus, Nec Aliter ("No more, No Less, No Different") than priests of the Russian Orthodox Church and the Old Believers.

In 1917, Metropolitan Andrei Sheptytsky appointed the first Apostolic Exarchate for Russian Catholics with Most Reverend Leonid Feodorov, formerly a Russian Orthodox seminarian, as Exarch. However, the October Revolution and Anti-Catholic religious persecution
soon followed, dispersing Russian-Rite Catholics to Siberia, the Gulag and the Russian diaspora throughout the world. 

At the same time, though, conversions continued to take place.

In 1918, Fr. Potapy Emelianov, a priest of the Old Ritualist tradition within Russian Orthodoxy, entered into communion with the Holy See along with his entire parish, which was located at Nizhnaya Bogdanovka, near Lugansk, in modern Ukraine.

In the spring of 1923, Exarch Leonid Feodorov was prosecuted for counterrevolution by Nikolai Krylenko and sentenced to ten years in the Soviet concentration camp at Solovki. Released in 1932, he died three years later. He was beatified in 2001 by Pope John Paul II.

Missions also continued among White émigrés in the Russian diaspora. Following her conversion, Hélène Iswolsky regularly attended the Divine Liturgy at the Church of the Holy Trinity, located near the Porte d'Italie in Paris. She later praised the pastor, Mgr. Alexander Evreinov, in her memoirs. Mgr. Alexander, Iswolsky wrote, offered the Byzantine Rite without the Latin Rite borrowings commonly added in Galicia and, "one might have thought oneself at an Orthodox service, except that prayers were offered for the Pope and our hierarchical head, the Archbishop of Paris." Iswolsky added that the chapel, although humble, "was decorated in the best of taste and according to the strictest Russian religious style; the iconostasis was the work of a Russian painter well-versed in ancient Eastern iconography. The central panel was a faithful copy of Rubleff's Trinity."

In 1928, a second Apostolic Exarchate was set up, for the Russian Catholics in China, based at Harbin in Manchuria; the Russian Catholic Apostolic Exarchate of Harbin.

The Collegium Russicum, which was founded on August 15, 1929 by Pope Pius XI, was intended to train Russian Greek Catholic priests to serve as missionaries in the growing Russian diaspora of anti-communist political refugees and, despite the anti-religious persecution taking place in the Soviet Union, in that very country. The money for the college building and its reconstruction was taken from an aggregate of charity donations from faithful all over the world on the occasion of the canonization of St. Thérèse of Lisieux and the Pope chose to place the Russicum under her patronage.

In 1932, Russian Orthodox Archbishop Bartholomew Remov was secretly received into the Russian Greek Catholic Church by Bishop Pie Eugène Neveu. After Remov's conversion became known to Joseph Stalin's NKVD, the Archbishop was arrested on 21 February 1935 and was accused of being, "a member of the Catholic group of a counterrevolutionary organization attached to the illegal Petrovsky Monastery" and of anti-Soviet agitation.

On June 17, 1935, a closed session of the Military Collegium of the Supreme Court of the Soviet Union sentenced Remov, "to the supreme penalty, death by shooting, with confiscation of property. The sentence is final and no appeal is allowed." 

Metropolitan Bartholomew Remov was executed soon after.

Following the collapse of the Soviet Union, the surviving Russian Catholics, many of whom were directly connected to the Greek Catholic community of Dominican Sisters founded in August 1917 by Mother Catherine Abrikosova, began to appear in the open. At the same time, the martyrology of the Russian Catholic Church began to be investigated.

In 2001, Exarch Leonid Feodorov was beatified during a Byzantine Rite Divine Liturgy offered in Lviv by Pope John Paul II.

In 2003, a positio towards the Causes for Beatification of six of what Fr. Christopher Zugger has termed, "The Passion bearers of the Russian Catholic Exarchate": Fabijan Abrantovich, Anna Abrikosova, Igor Akulov, Potapy Emelianov, Halina Jętkiewicz, and Andrzej Cikoto; was submitted to the Holy See's Congregation for the Causes of Saints by the Bishops of the Catholic Church in Russia.

With the religious freedom experienced after the fall of Communism, there were calls from the small number of Russian Catholics to appoint an Exarch to the long existing vacancy. Such a move would have been strongly objected to by the Russian Orthodox Church, causing the Holy See to not act out of concern for damaging ecumenism. In 2004, however, the Vatican's hand was forced when a convocation of Russian Catholic priests met in Sargatskoye, Omsk Oblast and used their rights under canon law to elect a Father Sergey Golovanov as temporary Exarch. The Vatican then moved quickly to replace Father Sergey with Bishop Joseph Werth, the Latin Church Apostolic Administrator of Siberia, based in Novosibirsk. Bishop Werth was appointed by Pope John Paul II as Ordinary for all non-Armenian Rite Eastern Catholics in the Russian Federation. As of 2010, five parishes have been registered with civil authorities in Siberia, while in Moscow two parishes and a pastoral center operate without official registration. There are also communities in Saint Petersburg and Obninsk. 

In the Russian diaspora, there are Russian Catholic parishes and faith communities in San Francisco, New York City, El Segundo, Denver, Melbourne, Buenos Aires, Dublin, Paris, Chevetogne, Lyon, Munich, Rome, Milan, and Singapore. Many are all under the jurisdiction of the respective local Latin Church bishops. The communities in Denver, Dublin, and Singapore do not have a Russian national character but exist for local Catholics who wish to worship in the Russo-Byzantine style. The community in Denver is currently under the jurisdiction of the Ruthenian Eparchy of Phoenix.

In a 2005 article, Russian Catholic priest Fr. Sergei Golovanov stated that three Russian Catholic priests served on Russian soil celebrating the Russian Byzantine Divine Liturgy. Two of them used the recension of the Russian Liturgy as reformed by Patriarch Nikon of Moscow in 1666. The other priest used the medieval rite of the Old Believers, that is to say, as the Russian liturgical recension existed before Patriarch Nikon's reforms of the Russian Liturgy. All Eastern Catholics in the Russian Federation strictly maintain the use of Church Slavonic, although vernacular Liturgies are more common in the Russian diaspora.

As of 2014, the two Exarchates of Russia and Harbin are still listed in the Annuario Pontificio as extant, but they have not yet been reconstituted, nor have new Russian-Rite bishops been appointed to head them.

By 2018, there have been reports of 13 parishes and five pastoral points in Siberia with seven parishes and three pastoral points in European Russia. Some parishes serve the Ukrainians in Russia. The Ordinariate has minimal structure. A Byzantine Catholic mitered archpriest serves as Secretary to the Ordinary. There is a priest coordinator for the parishes in Siberia and a liturgical commission and a catechetical commission.

 1997 – 2004 Protopresbyter Sergey Golovanov
 2004 – Present Bishop Joseph Werth (temporary)

Hierarchy

Uniate Church in the Russian Empire

In 1807 the Russian Empire continued to appoint its own primates for the Ruthenian Uniate Church without confirming them with the Pope.

Metropolitans of Kiev 
 Heraclius Lisovsky (1808–1809)
 Gregory Kokhanovich (1809–1814)
 Josafat Bulhak (1818–1838)
Following the Synod of Polatsk (1838), the Ruthenian Uniate Church was forcibly abolished on the territory of the Russian Empire, and its property, clergy, and laity were forcibly transferred to the Russian Orthodox Church.

Apostolic Exarchate of Russia

It is vacant since 1951, having had only two incumbents, both belonging to the Ukrainian Studite Monks (M.S.U., a Byzantine Rite Ukrainian Greek Catholic Church monastic order):
 Blessed Leontiy Leonid Feodorov, M.S.U. (1917.05.28 – 1935.03.07)
 Blessed Klymentiy Sheptytsky, M.S.U. (1939.09.17 – 1951.05.01); also first Hegumen of Ukrainian Studite Monks (1919 – 1944.11), then Archimandrite of Ukrainian Studite Monks (1944.11 – 1951.05.01)

Apostolic Exarchate of Harbin

See also
Anna Abrikosova
Peter Artemiev
Byzantine Rite
Chevetogne Abbey
Cathedral of the Immaculate Conception (Moscow)
Church Slavonic language
Eastern Catholic Churches
Florentine Union
Metropolitan Isidore of Kiev, All Russia and Moscow
Niederalteich Abbey
Russicum
Theresa Kugel
Vladimir Sergeyevich Solovyov
Church of the Assumption of Mary (Astrakhan)

References

In popular culture
 The opening scene of the 1980 romantic comedy The Black Marble was filmed inside St. Andrew's Russian Greek Catholic Church in El Segundo, California.

Sources
Eastern Catholic Communities Without Hierarchies

External links
Directory of Russian Greek Catholic churches, monasteries and institutions in the world.
The website of Saint Michael's Russian Catholic Church in New York City is a must for anyone desiring to delve deeper into the history of the Russian Catholic Movement.
“A Brief History of The Russian Byzantine Catholic Church and the Russian Catholics.”
An online article about a visit to Moscow's Russian Catholics shortly after the fall of the Soviet Union.
A visit to the same Russian rite Catholic community from 2001.
The Catholic Newmartyrs of Russia
Normalization of the Position of Byzantine Rite Catholics in Russia
The Byzantine – Slavic Rite
www.damian-hungs.de (in German)

 
History of Christianity in Russia
Catholic Church in Russia
1917 establishments in Russia
Christian organizations established in 1917
Christian organizations established in the 20th century